The 2019 Sacred Heart Pioneers football team represented Sacred Heart University as a member of the Northeast Conference (NEC) in the 2019 NCAA Division I FCS football season. They were led by seventh-year head coach Mark Nofri and played their home games at Campus Field.

Previous season

The Pioneers finished the 2018 season 7–4, 5–1 in NEC play to be NEC co-champions with Duquesne. Due to their head-to-head loss to Duquesne, they did not receive the NEC's automatic bid to the FCS Playoffs and did not receive and at-large bid.

Preseason

Preseason coaches' poll
The NEC released their preseason coaches' poll on July 24, 2019. The Pioneers were picked to finish in second place.

Preseason All-NEC team
The Pioneers had two players at two positions selected to the preseason all-NEC team.

Offense

Jordan Meachum – RB

Defense

Chris Agyemang – DL

Schedule

Game summaries

at No. 7 Maine

Bucknell

at Lafayette

at LIU

Central Connecticut

at Penn

Duquesne

at Saint Francis

at Bryant

Wagner

Lehigh

at Robert Morris

Ranking movements

References

Sacred Heart
Sacred Heart Pioneers football seasons
Sacred Heart Pioneers football